Krisztián Wittmann (born 22 May 1985) is a Hungarian professional basketball player, currently with Kecskeméti TE of the Hungarian NB I/A league.

He represented the Hungarian national basketball team at the EuroBasket 2017 qualification, where he recorded most steals for his team. Wittmann was also on the roster that played at EuroBasket 2017.

References

External links
Champions League profile
Basketball-Reference.com profile
Eurobasket.com profile

1985 births
Living people
Alba Fehérvár players
Guards (basketball)
Hungarian men's basketball players
Kecskeméti TE (basketball) players
Sportspeople from Székesfehérvár
PVSK Panthers players
Szolnoki Olaj KK players